The Proposed British Bill of Rights was a proposal of the Second Cameron ministry, included in their 2015 election manifesto, to replace the Human Rights Act 1998 with a new piece of primary legislation.

After resistance from within the governing Conservative party, leader David Cameron delayed introducing the legislation; the idea was not introduced again until 2022, when it was re-introduced by the Johnson government as a Bill of Rights.

Background
Prior to the 2010 general election, David Cameron proposed replacing the Human Rights Act with a new "British Bill of Rights". After forming a coalition with the Liberal Democrats, these plans were shelved and reinstated only after the Conservative party won an overall majority in the 2015 general election. Former Prime Minister David Cameron then vowed to put right what he termed the "complete mess" of Britain's human rights laws, on the 800th anniversary of the passage of the Magna Carta by the Kingdom of England, one of the predecessor states to the United Kingdom. Tensions arose between those on the political right in the UK, and the European Court of Human Rights, over issues such as prisoner voting.

Differences from the Human Rights Act
Specific details on the specific legislation are unknown due to sparse information being published, however, some proposed differences between existing legislation and a "British Bill of Rights", were made apparent early on, due to the way in which the Westminster system operates.

In order to change the text of the European Convention on Human Rights, there needed to be broad to unanimous agreement between member states of the Council of Europe. With a "British Bill of Rights", however, rights would be set forth by the UK parliament or by another body directly on its behalf, operating under the principle of parliamentary sovereignty. The ability to alter what constitutes a "right" would thus ultimately rest with the current parliament of the time.

As a result of this difference, the European Convention on Human Rights and the case law of the European Court of Human Rights would no longer be directly enforceable before domestic courts. However, the UK would remain bound under international law by the convention.

Moreover, the Convention provides that its provisions are minimum standards, that a member party can enact laws granting rights. Thus, a British Bill of Rights must reflect all the provisions of the ECHR. Ultimately, any person who had exhausted domestic remedy could refer their case to the European Court which has obtained before and since the enactment of the HRA 1998.

The proposals for the Bill of Rights appeared to not include denunciation of the ECHR, only repeal of the HRA 1998 which incorporated c1-12 and 14 of the ECHR. This would mean that, taking the previous paragraph into account, people in the UK would access their basic ECHR rights via the proposed Bill and the courts' interpretation of the Bill and its relationship to the ECHR. Denunciation would not free the UK from the provisions of the ECHR in that any matter which occurred prior to the date of denunciation would remain within the jurisdiction of the Court of the ECHR as provided by the convention.

See also
 Bill of rights
 Bill of Rights 1689

References

External links
 Abbott, Lewis F. Defending Liberty: The Case for a New Bill of Rights. (2019). ISR/Google Books.
 Dimelow, S and Young, A. 'Common Sense or Confusion? The Human Rights Act and the Conservative Party' 
 Bill Proposed to Parliament on 22 June 2022

Constitutional laws of the United Kingdom
Human rights in the United Kingdom
Human rights legislation
Proposed laws of the United Kingdom